The largest living snakes in the world, measured  either by length or by weight, are various members of the Boidae and Pythonidae families. They include anacondas, pythons and boa constrictors, which are all non-venomous 
constrictors.

There are fourteen living snake species with a maximum mass of at least , as shown in the table below. This includes all species that reach a length of at least . There are two other species that reach nearly this length the Oenpelli python (binomial name Nyctophilopython oenpelliensis, Simalia oenpelliensis or Morelia oenpelliensis), and the olive python (Liasis olivaceus). The information available about these two species is rather limited. The Oenpelli python, in particular, has been called the rarest python in the world. By weight, the blood python (Python brongersmai) is also a relatively massive snake, although it does not reach exceptional lengths.

It is important to be aware that there is considerable variation in the maximum reported size of these species, and most measurements are not truly verifiable, so the sizes listed should not be considered definitive. In general, the reported lengths are likely to be somewhat overestimated.

Although it is generally accepted that the reticulated python is the world's longest snake, most length estimates longer than  have been called into question. It has been suggested that confident length records for the largest snakes must be established from a dead body soon after death, or alternatively from a heavily sedated snake, using a steel tape and in the presence of witnesses, and must be published (and preferably recorded on video).

Although weight is easier to measure reliably than length (e.g., by simply measuring the weight of a container with and without the snake inside it and subtracting one measurement from the other), a significant factor in the weight of a snake is whether it has been kept in captivity and provided an unusual abundance of food in conditions that also cause reduced levels of activity. Moreover, the weight of wild specimens is often reduced as a symptom of parasite infestations that are eliminated by veterinary care in captivity. Thus, the largest weights measured for captive specimens often greatly exceed the largest weights observed in the wild for the same species. This phenomenon may particularly affect the weight measurements for anaconda species that are especially difficult to keep in captivity due to their semi-aquatic nature, resulting in other species having larger weights measured in captivity. In particular, the green anaconda (Eunectes murinus) is an especially massive snake if only observations in the wild are considered.

Largest serpent species in the world

By families

Boas (Boidae) 
The most massive living member of this highly diverse reptilian order is the green anaconda (Eunectes murinus) of the neotropical riverways. Rumors of larger anacondas also persist.

Typical Snakes (Colubridae) 
The genus Drymarchon also contains some of the largest colubrids such as the eastern indigo snake (Drymarchon couperi) and the indigo snake (Drymarchon corais) which can both reach lengths of almost . The first one mentoined may grows  and more.

Elapids (Elapidae) 

It is also the largest elapid.

Blind Snakes (Leptotyphlopidae)

Lamprophids (Lamprophiidae) 
The largest lamprophids Cape file snake (Heterolepsis capensis) is a medium to large snake. It has a very flat head, and its body is strikingly triangular in cross-section.

Vipers (Viperidae) 

Remarkable individual specimens 
Individual specimens considered among largest measured for their respective species include the following:
Burmese pythons:
"Baby" a captive Burmese python (Python bivittatus)  female♀ , ; "Baby" was kept at Serpent Safari in Gurnee, Illinois, until its death at almost 27 years old, euthanized due to deteriorating condition caused by a tumor in 2006. Several live measurements and post mortem measurement.
"Hexxie" a captive Burmese python (Python bivittatus)  female♀ ,  and still growing; "Hexxie" lives in a terraced house in Tewkesbury, Gloucestershire, England, with owner Marcus Hobbs.
Wild-caught non-native (invasive) Burmese python (Python bivittatus) female♀ ,  and measured  in diameter; She was carrying 122 developing eggs. Caught by a team of biologists in Everglades, Florida, June 22, 2022.
Wild-caught non-native (invasive) Burmese python (Python bivittatus) male♂ ,  and measured  in diameter; caught by Okeechobee Veterinary Hospital, Florida, July 31, 2009.
Wild-caught non-native (invasive) Burmese python (Python bivittatus) female♀ , ; caught in Miami-Dade County, Florida, October 2, 2020.
Wild-caught non-native (invasive) Burmese python (Python bivittatus) female♀ , ; caught in Miami-Dade County, Florida, May 11, 2012. Intact specimen measured post mortem by University of Florida.
Wild-caught non-native (invasive) Burmese python (Python bivittatus) female♀ , ; caught by University of Florida wildlife biologist in Miami-Dade County, Florida, July 9, 2015. Intact specimen measured post mortem by University of Florida.
Wild-caught non-native (invasive) Burmese python (Python bivittatus) female♀ , ; caught by Nicholas Banos and Leonardo Sanchez, Everglades, Florida, April 1, 2017.
Wild-caught non-native (invasive) Burmese python (Python bivittatus) female♀ , ; she was carrying 73 developing eggs. Caught by Big Cypress National Preserve, Florida, April 7, 2019. 
Reticulated pythons:
"Medusa" a captive reticulated python (Malayopython reticulatus) female♀  ; "Medusa" is kept at the Edge of Hell haunted house attraction in Kansas City, Missouri, and was last officially measured in 2011.
 "Samantha" a captive (originally wild-caught near Samarinda, Borneo, as an already very large adult) reticulated python (Malayopython reticulatus) female♀ , somewhat reliable in 2002
"Fluffy" a captive reticulated python (Malayopython reticulatus) female♀  ; "Fluffy" was last officially measured live on September 30, 2009, and died at the Columbus Zoo and Aquarium in Powell, Ohio, on October 26, 2010, due to an apparent tumor. She was 18 years old. 24 feet confirmed when measured at death.
"Colossus", a captive reticulated python (Maylayopython reticulatus) male♂, skeletal measurement  ; "Colossus" was kept at the Highland Park Zoo in Pittsburgh, Pennsylvania, died in April 1963, and the body was deposited at the Carnegie Museum.
"Twinkie" a captive reticulated python (Malayopython reticulatus) female♀  ; "Twinkie" found sanctuary in the 2014 Guinness World Records book as the world’s largest albino python in captivity. She was a fixture at the Reptile Zoo in Fountain Valley, CA.
"Super Snake", a captive reticulated python (Malayopython reticulatus) 14-year-old female♀ , ; "Super Snake" is kept at the National Aquarium in Al Qana, Abu Dhabi, United Arab Emirates.
Wild-caught reticulated python (Malayopython reticulatus) Female♀  adjusted post-mortem measurement, unreliable, originally measured alive at  unreliably, using an unknown method,  estimated weight upon capture, unreliable; caught April 7, 2016, Paya Terubong district, Penang Island, Malaysia. Died April 10, 2016.
Wild-caught reticulated python (Malayopython reticulatus) unknown sex , unverified; Was killed on October 5, 2017, Pekanbaru, Indonesia.
Wild-caught reticulated python (Malayopython reticulatus) unknown sex , ; Probably, this is largest snake in Phuket in last decade. Caught by Ruamjai Rescue Foundation, December 18, 2014, Phuket, Thailand.
Australian scrub pythons:
He is kept at the Currumbin Wildlife Sanctuary on the Gold Coast, Queensland.
Wild-caught scrub python (Simalia kinghorni) unknown sex , ; caught by Machans Beach in Cairns, Queensland, November 14, 2017.
Wild-caught scrub python (Simalia kinghorni) unknown sex , ; caught by Speewah in Mareeba, Queensland, unknown date.
Wild-caught scrub python (Simalia kinghorni) unknown sex , ; caught by Speewah in Mareeba, Queensland, February 6, 2017.

See also

List of largest reptiles
List of largest extant lizards
Largest organisms
Titanoboa, world's largest known snake from the fossil record
Gigantophis, one of the world's largest snakes (past record holder for the world's largest known snake from the fossil record)

References

Snakes
Largest